David François Theron  (born 15 September 1966) is a South African former rugby union player.

Playing career
Theron represented the South Africa Universities under–19 and under–20 teams in 1986. He made his senior provincial debut for Free State in 1988 and in 1995 he joined Griqualand West.

He made his test debut for the Springboks as a replacement against Australia on 3 August 1996 at the Free State Stadium in Bloemfontein. His last test match was against New Zealand at Eden Park in Auckland. Theron played thirteen test matches and two tour matched for the Springboks.

Test history

Coaching career
Theron started his coaching career with Griquas in 2002 as an assistant to Swys de Bruin. He was appointed the Griquas head coach in 2007 and in 2011 he was appointment as the South Africa under-20 head coach. In 2016 and 2017, Theron was the head coach of the DoCoMo Red Hurricanes in Japan.

See also
List of South Africa national rugby union players – Springbok no. 633

References

1966 births
Living people
South African rugby union coaches
South African rugby union players
South Africa international rugby union players
Free State Cheetahs players
Griquas (rugby union) players
Rugby union players from Bloemfontein
Rugby union props